Goveđi Brod (Serbian Cyrillic: Говеђи брод) is an urban neighborhood of Belgrade, the capital of Serbia. It is located in Belgrade's municipality of Zemun.

Location 

Goveđi Brod is the northwestern extension of urban Zemun proper, located on the right bank of the Danube. It occupies roughly the area between the Danube and the road which connects Zemun and the outer suburb of Batajnica (Batajnički drum). The only other urban neighborhood that it borders is Galenika, but it extends in the direction of Zemun Polje (northwest) and Gornji Grad (south, through Galenika).

Characteristics 

Goveđi Brod is almost entirely a non-residential area. Some major facilities in the neighborhood are the Mining Institute and the Veterinarian Institute. The neighborhood also includes a large area of storehouses, and two gravel and concrete processing plants, "DIA" and "Anicom", both on the Danube's bank.

Romani 
However, the publicly best known characteristic of Goveđi Brod is a former informal settlement of the Romani people within the neighborhood. Known for having some of the worst living conditions in Belgrade area (total lack of running water, electricity, sewage, etc.), the settlement inhabited mostly by the Roma refugees from Kosovo and Metohija was set right in the Danube's river bed and was regularly flooded every spring with the rise of the water level of the river. 

As a result of its position, Goveđi Brod was literally wiped out during the major 2006 European floods. In February 2007 Roma families moved into the new houses built in the new neighborhood of Plavi Horizonti in Zemun. As the name of the neighborhood means cattle ship, newspapers announced that "cattle ship was finally anchored". However, some of the old inhabitants of Govedji Brod returned to their flooded houses and renewed them, together with keeping new homes in Plavi Horizonti.

References 

Neighborhoods of Belgrade
Romani communities in Serbia
Squatting in Serbia